Echiodon drummondii, sometimes called Drummond's echiodon or Drummond's pearlfish, and in Ireland simply called the pearlfish, is a species of fish in the family Carapidae (pearlfish).

It is named for James Lawson Drummond, who collected the holotype at Carnlough, Ireland in 1836.

Description
Echiodon drummondii is reddish in colour with a silvery abdomen, operculum and iris and dark markings on the head. Its eyes are large, and lateral line is very faint.

Habitat

Behaviour
Echiodon drummondii can be free-living and feeds on small invertebrates, fish and bottom-dwellers. It is also known to live inside sea cucumbers; the cucumber opens its anus to breathe in, and the pearlfish swims in. Eggs have been discovered in the seabed off County Kerry.

References

Carapidae
Fish described in 1837
Fish of the North Sea